Shalini Balasundaram  is a Malaysian film director and actress. She is known for directing and acting as the main heroine in the Malaysia Tamil film industry. She gained a breakthrough with her directorial debut Geethaiyin Raadhai and went on to direct and act in other films.

Early life 
Shalini was born on 25 October 1993 in Selangor Malaysia to her parents Balasundaram and Indradevi. Shalini was only child to her parents. A very middle-class family background carried by Shalini where her parents runs a provision shop. She grew up in Kuala Lumpur with her parents. Shalini did her primary school studying in Methodist Girls School (MGS) and continues her secondary school studying in SMK Bukit Bandaraya. Her ambition to be a film maker is been aspired since she was 15 years old. Shalini has watched so many movies of directors like K.Balachander, Balumahendra and Maniratnam during her childhood. Her dream of becoming a film maker became a decision in the age of 15.  Completing a 4 years of foundation plus degree Shalini successfully graduated from Limkokwing University in the year 2014.

Filmography 
Balasundaram has directed and/or acted in the following films.

Films 

Short films
Inai (2015)

Awards and nominations

References

External links 
 

Living people
1993 births
People from Kuala Lumpur
Malaysian film actresses
Malaysian film directors
Malaysian film producers
Malaysian women film producers
Malaysian people of Indian descent
Malaysian people of Tamil descent
Tamil film producers
21st-century Malaysian actresses